Rita Kalonga (born 16 August 1996), known professionally by her stage name Ritaa, is a Malawian musician, singer, songwriter and Entrepreneur

Life and career
Based in Malawi's commercial city, Blantyre, Ritaa's breakthrough came in 2016 after releasing "Chapatali". The song features one of Malawi's pop stars, Dan Lu. The song peaked at number 1 on local charts,. Ritaa has worked with producers like BFB who used to produce for HHP and Blasto and has shared a stage with Tay Grin and co-headlined Carlsberg Malawi urban music bash. Ritaa draws her inspiration from the likes of Rihanna, Beyonce and the late Whitney Houston. She fuses Afro-pop, R&B, dancehall, and pop.

Legacy
Chapatali is the first song by a female artist to chart on number 1 in Malawi Music top 100 and Weekly Malawi Music Top 20 chart by malawi-music.com. It remains the only song by a Malawian female artist to register over a hundred thousand downloads and half a million online streams on Malawi Music official website. In 2016, she also made history when she became the first Malawian female musician to have three songs at number 1 in the top 100 Malawi Music chart.

Feminism and women's rights
Ritaa has been described as a feminist in the Malawi music industry. She has openly challenged patriarchy and championed for the rights of women in the country including freedom of dressing for women and girls in a country that is predominantly patriarchy.

See also
Music of Malawi

References

External links
Official website

1995 births
Living people
21st-century Malawian women singers
Feminist musicians